The Roman Catholic Archdiocese of Mendoza is in Argentina and is a metropolitan diocese.  Its suffragan sees include Neuquén and San Rafael.

History
On 20 April 1934, Pope Pius XI established the Diocese of Mendoza from the Diocese of San Juan de Cuyo.  It lost territory to the Diocese of San Rafael when it was created in 1961.  At the same time, the Diocese of Mendoza was elevated to an archdiocese by Pope John XXIII on 10 April 1961.

2016–2017 sexual abuse scandal
On 5 May 2017, Kosaka Kumiko, a Japanese-Argentinian nun, was arrested and accused of helping priests sexually abuse children at a school for youths with hearing disabilities in Mendoza Province. Kumiko's arrest came after the arrests of two priests: Horacio Corbacho and Nicola Corradi. Three other men employed at one of the Antonio Provolo Institute for the Deaf's Argentine schools were arrested for acts. Corradi had previously been accused as early as 2009 of committing sex abuse at the Antonio Provolo Institute for the Deaf's main campus in Verona, Italy.

On 15 June 2019, it was announced that the two priests will stand trial on 5 August 2019. The two priests will face trial in Argentina, where they were jailed after being accused of sexually abusing 22 children at the Argentine school. The trial began as scheduled Institute employee Armando Gomez also joined the two priests as a co-defendant. Former institute employee Jorge Bordón had been sentenced to 10 years in prison in 2018 for sex abuse at the institute as well. The trial is expected to last for two more months.

Bishops

Ordinaries
José Aníbal Verdaguer y Corominas (1934–1940)
Alfonso María Buteler (1940–1973)
Olimpo Santiago Maresma (1974–1979)
Cándido Genaro Rubiolo (1979–1996)
José María Arancibia (1996–2012)
Carlos María Franzini (2012–2017)
Marcelo Daniel Colombo (2018-

Coadjutor archbishop
José María Arancibia (1993–1996)

Auxiliary bishops
José Miguel Medina (bishop) (1962-1965), appointed Bishop of Jujuy
Olimpo Santiago Maresma (1965-1974), appointed Archbishop here
Rafael Eleuterio Rey (1983-1991), appointed Bishop of Zárate-Campana
Sergio Osvaldo Buenanueva (2008-2013), appointed Bishop of San Francisco
Dante Gustavo Braida Lorenzón (2015-2018), appointed Bishop of La Rioja
Marcelo Fabián Mazzitelli (2017-

Other priests of this diocese who became bishops
Paulino Reale Chirina, appointed Bishop of Venado Tuerto in 1989
Pedro Daniel Martínez Perea (priest here, 1981–1986), appointed Coadjutor Bishop of San Luis in 2009

Territorial losses

References

Roman Catholic dioceses in Argentina
Roman Catholic Ecclesiastical Province of Mendoza
Christian organizations established in 1934
Roman Catholic dioceses and prelatures established in the 20th century